Xylophanes fusimacula is a moth of the  family Sphingidae. It is found from Brazil to Colombia and Bolivia.

Adults are similar in colour and pattern to Xylophanes undata and Xylophanes zurcheri but can be distinguished by the entire (not crenulated) outer margin of the forewing. Furthermore, the first, second and fourth postmedian lines are conspicuous, strongly crenulated and more oblique, delineating a narrow, rectangular, pale purple-grey patch.

Adults are probably on wing year-round.

The larvae possibly feed on Psychotria panamensis, Psychotria nervosa and Pavonia guanacastensis.

References

fusimacula
Moths described in 1874